"Homer the Whopper" is the twenty-first season premiere of the American animated television series The Simpsons. It originally aired on the Fox network in the United States on September 27, 2009. In the episode, Comic Book Guy creates a new superhero called Everyman who takes powers from other superheroes. Homer is cast as the lead in the film adaptation. To get Homer into shape, the movie studio hires a celebrity fitness trainer, Lyle McCarthy, to help him. Homer gets into great shape and is really excited, but when McCarthy leaves to train another client, he starts over-eating again and ultimately this leads to the film's failure.

The episode was written by Seth Rogen and Evan Goldberg, who are "obsessed" fans of the show, and directed by Lance Kramer. "Homer The Whopper" was intended to be a commentary on how Hollywood treats superhero films. Rogen also guest stars in the episode as the character Lyle McCarthy, making him the second guest star to both write an episode and appear in it; Ricky Gervais was the first.

"Homer the Whopper" has received mixed reviews from television critics and acquired a Nielsen rating of 4.3 in its original broadcast.

Plot
Bart and Milhouse convince Comic Book Guy to publish a comic book he wrote titled Everyman, in which the title character can absorb superpowers from the characters of comic books he touches. The comic becomes an instant hit, and many Hollywood studios become interested in making it into a film. Comic Book Guy agrees to let Everyman become a film, but only if he can pick the star. When Comic Book Guy sees Homer, he considers Homer perfect for the role, as he wants Everyman to be played by a middle-aged fat man. But the studio executives realize that audiences want a physically fit actor for the role, so they hire celebrity fitness trainer Lyle McCarthy to get Homer into shape. After a month, Homer becomes fit and the film begins production.

Soon afterward, however, McCarthy leaves Homer for another client. Without McCarthy to keep him in shape, Homer starts eating again and gains all the weight back. Homer can no longer fit into his costume or even his trailer, and the film begins to go over budget. The studio executives and Comic Book Guy worry that the film will not be successful. The final version of the film features scenes with the fat Homer and the physically fit Homer merged, upsetting and confusing the audience. After the premiere of the film, McCarthy returns and offers to get Homer into shape again, which Homer accepts. The studio executives offer to let Comic Book Guy direct the sequel, on the condition that Comic Book Guy lie to the fans and say he liked the film. Though pleased by the offer, Comic Book Guy rejects it and openly criticizes the film online, and thus it becomes a box office failure and Everyman is never adapted again.

Production

Seth Rogen and Evan Goldberg, writers of the film Superbad, are "obsessed" fans of The Simpsons. After learning that The Simpsons executive producer James L. Brooks was a fan of Superbad, they decided to ask the producers of the show if they could write an episode. In 2006, Ricky Gervais, co-creator of The Office, received credit for writing the season 17 episode "Homer Simpson, This Is Your Wife". Rogen and Goldberg "thought if [Gervais] got to write one, maybe [they] could try." They were invited to The Simpsons writers room, where they pitched several episode ideas. One was accepted, and they wrote an outline with the help of some feedback from the regular writers.

Rogen commented that he and Goldberg wanted to show with the episode how Hollywood generally ruins superhero films. He said that "the whole joke is that Homer is cast to play a guy who's an everyman and they try to make him into this physically fit guy." Rogen also noted that the plot mirrors the situation he was in while working on the film The Green Hornet, when he had to lose weight and do physical training for his role. Show runner Al Jean commented that the writers tried not to repeat the comic book film theme from the "Radioactive Man" episode. Instead they decided to parody the fact that almost every comic book has been turned into a film. Jean commented that that scene in the episode in which the studio executives "are trying to think up an idea that hasn't been done really is what they are doing these days [in real life]."

The table read took place in August 2008, and production on the episode began soon after that. Rogen later said that "we sat down for a read-through and three hours later I'm in a studio improv-ing with Homer Simpson, it was the single greatest day of my life." Rogen also guest stars in the episode as the character Lyle McCarthy, making him the second guest star to both write an episode and appear in it; Gervais also appeared in the episode he wrote. The Simpsons creator Matt Groening also makes an appearance in the episode.

Reception
In its original American broadcast in the United States on September 27, 2009, "Homer The Whopper" was watched in 8.31 million homes and acquired a 4.3 Nielsen rating/12 share.

Since airing, "Homer the Whopper" has received mixed to positive reviews from television critics.

Steve Fritz of Newsarama called the episode "amazing" and commented that the "overall comic book theme was perfect."

Reviewers for TV Guide cited Matt Groening's cameo, the dinner table scene, Homer trying to lose weight at the Kwik-E-Mart, and the opening scene where Bart questions Comic Book Guy about Spider-Man as the highlights of the episode.

Robert Canning of IGN was positive about "Homer The Whopper", giving it an 8.6/10 rating. He commented that the first act of the episode was the strongest, while the others were weaker. Canning believed the reason for this was that the viewers have already seen Homer "struggle with his weight countless times, and Rogen's trainer, though funny much of the time, will likely never be remembered as a classic guest role." He added, however, that Rogen and Goldberg are able to find "a few new angles with the weight jokes, so it's not a complete loss." Overall, Canning thought "Homer The Whopper" was a good start to the twenty-first season, and although the plot may not be very original, the writers added "freshness to the proceedings."

The A.V. Clubs Emily VanDerWerff did not think the script was as good as Gervais', but commented that Rogen and Goldberg "managed to make a mostly amusing season premiere." She added that she thought the Hollywood satirizing featured in this episode had been overused on the show, but "the specificity of what the [episode] was making fun of—trainers who help stars slim down (in this case, helping Homer slim down)—went a long way toward making the episode palatable." VanDerWerff concluded that while the episode "didn't try anything new[...], [she] had fun with it all the same, ultimately giving the episode a B."

References

External links

The Simpsons (season 21) episodes
2009 American television episodes